Jasmin Emrić (born 29 November 1969) is a Bosnian politician. He has served in the House of Representatives of Bosnia and Herzegovina since 2014 as a member of the political party (NES).

Early life
Emrić was born in Bužim, Bosnia and Herzegovina, then part of the Socialist Federal Republic of Yugoslavia. His parliamentary biography indicates that he is an engineer in the field of geodesy and that he was the director of the organization GEOID in Bihać until 2014.

Political career
Emrić was elected to the municipal council of Bužim as a candidate of the Party of Democratic Action (SDA) in 2000. The SDA won a landslide majority in this election, and Emrić was subsequently chosen by councillors as the city's mayor. He left the SDA at some point between 2000 and 2004 and was re-elected as mayor as an independent candidate in the 2004 municipal elections, the first to be held after Bosnia and Herzegovina introduced the direct election of mayors. He joined the A-SDA in 2008 and was defeated by SDA candidate Mirsad Šahinović in the 2008 municipal elections.

He was elected to the Una-Sana Canton legislature in the 2010 elections and served until the end of his term in 2014, leading a four-member grouping from his party.

Emrić was elected to the House of Representatives of Bosnia and Herzegovina in the 2014 general election, winning a seat in the first electoral division of the Federation of Bosnia and Herzegovina (one of the two entities that makes up the country). He is the first person to serve in the country's legislature as a member of the A-SDA, and he does not belong to any parliamentary caucus.

As of 2016, he on serves the House of Representatives finance and budget committee, the committee for the election of the Bosnia and Herzegovina Council of Ministers, and the joint committee on economic reforms and development. He is a member of the parliamentary friendship group for North and South America, Australia, Oceania, and Japan.

Electoral record

References

External links
Jasmin Emrić (biographical entry), Parliamentary Assembly of Bosnia and Herzegovina

1969 births
Members of the House of Representatives (Bosnia and Herzegovina)
Living people
Party of Democratic Activity politicians